Scaurus may refer to:
 Marcus Scaurus (disambiguation), several persons
 Quintus Terentius Scaurus, a Roman grammarian
 Scaurus (beetle), a darkling beetle genus in the subfamily Tenebrioninae and tribe Scaurini